Osypenko may refer to:

Osypenko, Solone Raion, a village, Dnipropetrovsk Oblast, Ukraine
Osypenko, Berdyansk Raion, a village, Zaporizhia Oblast, Ukraine
Osypenko, Sevastopol, a village under the jurisdiction of the city of Sevastopol, Ukraine
Osypenko, name of the town of Berdyansk, Ukraine, in 1939–1958
Osypenko (surname)

See also
 
 Osipenko (disambiguation)